Graham Nickson (born 1946) is a British artist known for large-scale figurative paintings and drawings. He was born in Knowle Green, United Kingdom. He has lived in New York City since 1976 and he has been Dean of the New York Studio School since 1988, where he developed a "Drawing Marathon," a two-week program of intensive study. Nickson works in oils, acrylics, charcoal, and watercolor.

Education and awards 
Nickson studied at the Camberwell School of Art and the Royal College of Art, London. He was the recipient of the Prix de Rome in 1972 and the Harkness Fellowship at Yale University in 1976. In 1989 he was awarded a Guggenheim Fellowship.  He received the Howard Foundation Fellowship from Brown University in 1980 and the Ingram Merrill Fellowship in 1993.

Work and exhibitions 
Nickson is known for his large acrylic and oil paintings of bathers on beaches and for his watercolor sunrises and sunsets. He is represented by Betty Cuningham Gallery, New York; with his most recent show in 2022. In 2019, he had an exhibition at the same gallery featuring frontal portraits in oil, "Eye Level".

Collections
Nickson has works in the collections of the Metropolitan Museum of Art, New York, the National Gallery, Washington, DC, the Museum of Modern Art, New York, the Yale University Art Gallery, New Haven, Connecticut, and the Morgan Library and Museum, New York, among others.

References 

1946 births
Living people